Trodusquemine is an aminosterol (a polyamine-steroid) similar to squalamine that is an allosteric inhibitor of protein-tyrosine phosphatase 1B (PTP1B).  It was isolated from the dogfish shark by scientists at Magainin Pharmaceuticals (subsequently called Genaera) in 2000 and underwent some drug development as a potential treatment for diabetes or obesity, but the company ran out of money and closed in 2009.   

Trodusquemine and some other drug assets were sold to Ohr Pharmaceutical for $200,000 by Genaera's liquidator.  In 2014 a company called Depymed was formed based on work done on PTP1B inhibitors at Cold Spring Harbor Laboratory, and it licensed rights to Trodusquemine from Ohr. Depymed wanted to develop it for HER2-positive breast cancer.  As of 2017, Depymed was running a Phase I clinical trial of the drug.

Coronary heart disease
British Heart Foundation trials using mice with atherosclerosis which were conducted at the University of Aberdeen suggests a link between atherosclerosis and insulin resistance due to impaired insulin receptor (IR) signalling. Inhibiting the activity of PTP1B, which is the major negative regulator of the insulin receptor appeared to inhibit atherosclerotic plaque formation. The trial mice reportedly had significantly less fatty plaques in their arteries following a single dose of trodusquemine.

References 

Experimental drugs
Enzyme inhibitors
Polyamines
Cholestanes
Secondary amines
Sulfate esters